Nebria steensensis is a species of ground beetle from Nebriinae subfamily that is endemic to the US state of Oregon.

References

steensensis
Beetles described in 1984
Beetles of North America
Endemic fauna of Oregon